Flower Garland with Dragonfly is a painting by the Flemish artist Michaelina Wautier. It was painted in 1652.

References 

Paintings by Michaelina Wautier
1652 paintings
Insects in art
Flower paintings
Skulls in art